This page lists legal decisions of the House of Lords. Until 30 September 2009, the House of Lords was the highest appellate court for the United Kingdom. Cases were determined not by the House of Lords itself, but by its Judicial Committee, consisting of up to nine legally qualified peers, generally referred to as "Law Lords". On 1 October 2009 its functions were transferred to the Supreme Court of the United Kingdom.

For a complete list of all legal cases heard by the House of Lords, see List of United Kingdom House of Lords cases.

See also 
 List of United Kingdom House of Lords cases
 List of Judicial Committee of the Privy Council cases
 List of Supreme Court of Judicature cases

External links 
House of Lords cases since 1996

 
United Kingdom
United Kingdom law-related lists
Cases